Takin' Off is the debut album by jazz pianist Herbie Hancock released in 1962 by Blue Note Records. Featuring veteran tenor saxophonist Dexter Gordon, trumpeter Freddie Hubbard, bassist Butch Warren and drummer Billy Higgins. The album is a creative example of music in the hard bop idiom. The bluesy track "Watermelon Man" made it to the Top 100 of the singles charts, and went on to become a jazz standard. Hancock released a funk arrangement of “Watermelon Man” on his 1973 album Head Hunters. Takin' Off was initially released on CD in 1996 and then again in remastered form in 2007 by Rudy Van Gelder.

Track listing
All compositions by Herbie Hancock.

Bonus tracks on reissue

Personnel
Herbie Hancock – piano
Freddie Hubbard – trumpet
Dexter Gordon – tenor saxophone
Butch Warren – double bass
Billy Higgins – drums

References

1962 debut albums
Blue Note Records albums
Herbie Hancock albums
Albums produced by Alfred Lion
Hard bop albums
Soul jazz albums
Modal jazz albums
Albums recorded at Van Gelder Studio